Webster Clark Belknap (November 29, 1850 – December 23, 1937) was an American politician in the state of Washington. He served in the Washington State Senate from 1893 to 1897.

References

Washington (state) Populists
1850 births
1937 deaths
Republican Party Washington (state) state senators
People from Benton County, Oregon